Biosphere reserves are areas comprising terrestrial, marine and coastal ecosystems. The biosphere reserve title is handed over by UNESCO. Each reserve promotes solutions reconciling the conservation of biodiversity with its sustainable use. Biosphere reserves are 'Science for Sustainability support sites' – special places for testing interdisciplinary approaches to understanding and managing changes and interactions between social and ecological systems, including conflict prevention and management of biodiversity. Biosphere reserves are nominated by national governments and remain under the sovereign jurisdiction of the states where they are located. Their status is internationally recognized.

Reserves
The Philippines currently has three UNESCO Biosphere Reserves. The first Biosphere of the country was designated in 1977.

The Palawan Biosphere Reserve is the only biosphere reserve in the country that contains a Ramsar Wetland Site (Tubbataha Reefs Natural Park) and two UNESCO World Heritage Sites (Tubbataha Reefs National Park and the Puerto Princesa Subterranean River National Park)

The Philippines became a committee member of the Man and Biosphere Programme of UNESCO in 2016 and shall retain the position until 2019.

Ecological frontiers like Eastern Mindanao, Eastern Visayas, Sibuyan island, Western Panay, the Sierra Madre, Southern Mindanao, the Sulu Archipelago, and the Cordilleras are theoretically capable of standing as UNESCO Biosphere Reserves in the future, along with specific Key Biodiversity Areas (KBAs) designated by Haribon Foundation and the Department of Environment and Natural Resources. In comparison to the 3 biosphere reserve of the Philippines, Indonesia has 11 biosphere reserves, China has 33, India has 10, Iran has 11, Japan has 9, Kazakhstan has 8, South Korea has 5, Sri Lanka has 4, and Vietnam has 9. The Philippines is one of the 18 ecological hotpot countries of the world, containing more than 228 Key Biodiversity Areas (KBAs).

Albay is the latest to be added to UNESCO's World Network of Biosphere Reserves in 2016. The government plans to nominate reserves in the Philippines annually once its committee membership ends.

Reserves by Philippine regions
Exclusive UNESCO Biosphere reserved refer to reserved locating in a single community/region. Shared reserves refer to reserved with entries in multiple communities/regions.

Proposed Reserves
On July 27, 2018, the provincial government of Apayao announced their intent to start the long process to declare the Calanasan rainforests as a protected area and a UNESCO Biosphere Reserve or World Heritage Site. The site is the stronghold of Philippine eagles in Luzon, the largest island in the Philippines. The province also noted that they have sent four of their personnel to train in the United States under the US Foreign Service to hasten the declaration of the site.

See also
 List of World Heritage Sites in the Philippines
 List of Ramsar sites in the Philippines
 List of protected areas of the Philippines

References

 
Philippines geography-related lists